Teocchiana is a monotypic beetle genus in the family Cerambycidae described by Eric Jiroux, Philippe Garreau, Joan Bentanachs and Patrick Prévost in 2014. Its only species, Teocchiana pallida, was described by Per Olof Christopher Aurivillius in 1924.

References

Lamiini
Beetles described in 1924
Monotypic beetle genera